The Virgin Islands competed at the 2019 Pan American Games in Lima, Peru from July 26 to August 11, 2019.

The Virgin Islands team was named in July 2019, with the squad consisting of 29 athletes (14 men and 15 women) competing in five sports. This marked an increase of 11 athletes from four years prior in Toronto.

During the opening ceremony of the games, track and field athlete Eduardo Garcia carried the flag of the country as part of the parade of nations.

Competitors
The following is the list of number of competitors (per gender) participating at the games per sport/discipline.

Athletics (track and field)

The Virgin Islands qualified two male track and field athletes.
Key
Note–Ranks given for track events are for the entire round
DNS–Did not start

Track and road events
Men

Basketball

The Virgin Islands qualified both a men's and women's team of 12 athletes each, after both placed in the top 7 of the 2017 FIBA AmeriCup and 2017 FIBA Women's AmeriCup respectively. This will mark the nation's debut in women's basketball at the Pan American Games. The men's team consisted of ten athletes, while the women's had 11, for a total of 21.

Men's tournament

Roster

Source: 

Group B

Seventh place match

Women's tournament

Roster

Source:

Group B

Seventh place match

Beach volleyball

The Virgin Islands qualified a women's pair.

Sailing

The Virgin Islands received a universality spot in the women's laser radial event.

Swimming

The Virgin Islands qualified three swimmers (two men and one woman).

See also
Virgin Islands at the 2020 Summer Olympics

References

Nations at the 2019 Pan American Games
2019
2019 in United States Virgin Islands sports